The Nor.Ca. Women's Handball Championship is the official competition for Women's national handball teams of North America and Caribbean. In addition to crowning the Nor.Ca. champions, the tournament also served as a qualifying tournament for the Pan American Handball Championship. Starting from the 2019 edition the tournament is a qualifying event for the IHF World Women's Handball Championship.

Summary

Medal table

Participating nations

See also
 Nor.Ca. Men's Handball Championship
 Pan American Women's Handball Championship
 Handball at the Pan American Games

References

External links
www.norcahandball.com

 
North America and Caribbean Handball Confederation competitions